Gabiden Mustafin (Ғабиден Мұстафин; 1902–1984) was a Kazakh author and a senior official in the Communist Party of Kazakhstan.

References

1902 births
1984 deaths